:  
The Goa Legislative Assembly election, 2017 was held on February 4, 2017 to elect the 40 members of the Seventh Goa Legislative Assembly, as the term of Sixth Legislative Assembly ended on March 18, 2017. VVPAT-fitted EVMs was used in entire Goa state in the 2017 elections, which was the first time that an entire state in India saw the implementation of VVPAT.

Background
The term of the Legislative Assembly ended on March 18, 2017. The last election had resulted in a 21-seat majority to the Bharatiya Janata Party led by Manohar Parrikar. Parrikar was elected Chief Minister. In 2014, he had to resign due to being nominated as Minister of Defence. Laxmikant Parsekar took oath as Chief Minister as Parrikar's successor.

Opinion polls

Turnout

Results

|- bgcolor="#E9E9E9" align="center"
! style="text-align:left;" rowspan="2" colspan="2" width="485"| Parties and coalitions
! colspan="3"| Popular vote
! colspan="2"| Seats
|- bgcolor="#E9E9E9" align="center"
! width="70"| Votes
! width="45"| %
! width="45"| ± %
! width="30"| Won
! width="30"| +/−
|-
| 
| align="left"| Bharatiya Janata Party (BJP)
| 2,97,588 || 32.5 || 2.2
| 13 || 8
|-
| 
| align="left"| Indian National Congress (INC)
| 2,59,758 || 28.4 || 2.4
| 17 || 8
|-
| 
| align="left"| Maharashtrawadi Gomantak Party (MAG)
| 1,03,290 || 11.3 || 4.6
| 3 || 
|-
| 
| align="left"| Independents (IND)
| 1,01,922 || 11.1 || 5.5
| 3 || 2
|-
| 
| align="left"| Aam Aadmi Party (AAP)
| 57,420 || 6.3 || 6.3
| 0 || 
|-
| bgcolor="#353982"|
| align="left"| Goa Forward Party (GFP)
| 31,900 || 3.5 || 3.5
| 3 || 3
|-
| 
| align="left"| Nationalist Congress Party (NCP)
| 20,916  || 2.3 || 1.8
| 1 || 1
|-
| bgcolor="grey"|
| align="left"| Goa Suraksha Manch (GSM)
| 10,745  || 1.2 || 1.2
| 0 || 
|-
| bgcolor="yellow"|
| align="left"| United Goans Party (UGP)
| 8,563|| 0.9 || 0.9
| 0 || 
|-
| bgcolor="orange"|
| align="left"| Goa Vikas Party (GVP)
| 5,379 || 0.6 || 2.9
| 0 || 2
|-
| bgcolor="black"|
| align="left"| Others
| 7,816 || 0.9 || 2.9
| 0 || 
|-
| bgcolor=white|
| align="left"| None of the Above (NOTA)
| 10,919 || 1.2 || 1.2
| colspan="2" 
|-
| colspan="7" bgcolor="#E9E9E9"|
|- style="font-weight:bold;"
| align="left" colspan="2"| Total
| 9,16,216 || 100.00 || bgcolor="#E9E9E9"|
| 40 || ±0
|-
! colspan="9" |
|-
| style="text-align:left;" colspan="2" |Valid votes
| align="right" |9,16,216
| align="right" |99.85
| colspan="4" rowspan="5" style="background-color:#E9E9E9"  |
|-
| style="text-align:left;" colspan="2" |Invalid votes
| align="right" |1,416
| align="right" |0.15
|-
| style="text-align:left;" colspan="2" |Votes cast / turnout
| align="right" |9,17,832
| align="right" |82.56
|-
| style="text-align:left;" colspan="2" |Abstentions
| align="right" | 1,93,860
| align="right" |17.44
|-
| style="text-align:left;" colspan="2" |Registered voters
| align="right" | 11,11,692
|colspan="1" style="background-color:#E9E9E9"|
|-

Results by Constituency 
The following is the list of winning MLAs in the election.

By-elections

See also
 2017 elections in India

References

External links
Goa Election Commission

State Assembly elections in Goa
2010s in Goa
2017 State Assembly elections in India